Musaba Selemani (born 25 May 1985 in Bujumbura) is a Burundian footballer who currently plays for RDC Cointe-Liège.

Career
Selemani also played for Prince Louis FC of Bujumbura in Burundi and K. Londerzeel S.K., FC Brussels and R. Union Saint-Gilloise in Belgium. He joined RFC Liège for the 2010/11 season.

International career
He was member of the Burundi national team.

References

1985 births
Living people
Burundian footballers
Burundi international footballers
Expatriate footballers in the Netherlands
R.W.D.M. Brussels F.C. players
Expatriate footballers in Belgium
Association football midfielders
Royale Union Saint-Gilloise players
HSV Hoek players
Sportspeople from Bujumbura
Burundian expatriates in Belgium
Place of birth missing (living people)
Prince Louis FC players